Pearl is a 1978 American television miniseries about events leading up to the attack on Pearl Harbor, written by Stirling Silliphant. It starred a large cast, notably Dennis Weaver, Tiana Alexandra, Robert Wagner, Angie Dickinson, Brian Dennehy, Lesley Ann Warren, Gregg Henry, Max Gail, Richard Anderson, Marion Ross, Audra Lindley, Char Fontane, Katherine Helmond and Adam Arkin.

The miniseries aired in three installments on ABC on November 16, 17 and 19, 1978.  All three parts were among the top ten most watched prime time shows of the week, with the series watched all or in part by about 80 million people.

Cast
Angie Dickinson as Midge Forrest
Dennis Weaver as Col. Jason Forrest
Robert Wagner as Capt. Cal Lankford
Lesley Ann Warren as Dr. Carol Lang
Tiana Alexandra as Holly Nagata
Gregg Henry as Lt. Doug North
Katherine Helmond as Mrs. Sally Colton
Adam Arkin as Pvt. Billy Zylowski
Brian Dennehy as Sgt. Otto Chain
Max Gail as 1st Sgt. Walder
Char Fontane as Shirley
Audra Lindley as Lily (General's Wife)
Richard Anderson as Cmdr. Michael North
Marion Ross as Ellie North
Allan Miller as Harrison
Christian Vance as Pvt. John Finger
Mary Crosby as Patricia North
Charles Lucia as Lt. Christopher
So Yamamura as commander of the Japanese carrier force (uncredited)

Plot summary
While the Japanese First Air Fleet sails toward Hawaii personnel at the varied bases as well as civilians go about their lives.  Primary protagonists are hard scrabble and bigoted Army MP Colonel Jason Forrest and his clashes with his bitter wife Midge, his well-to-do XO Captain Calvin Lankford, and briefly with local news writer Holly Nagata and punkish MP Sergeant Otto Chain.

On the Navy side are Lieutenant Douglas North and his father (Commander Michael North) and mother and also his reacquaintance with former classmate Holly Nagata, a friendship she successfully makes a romantic relationship (right to seducing Doug in her car; though unstated in the miniseries their lovemaking results in pregnancy).

Everyone’s lives are torn asunder when the Japanese attack strikes the island.

Production
To keep production costs manageable, the scenes of the attack were footage originally shot for the film Tora! Tora! Tora!. The miniseries also used newly dubbed footage of So Yamamura to portray Admiral Isoroku Yamamoto, the Japanese commander of the attack.

Novelization
Some sources erroneously cite the miniseries as based on a novel by dramatist Sterling Silliphant, but in fact the reverse is true. As the copyright and publication dates indicate, Silliphant novelized his scripts for a paperback original, intended in part to promote the mimniseries. (Silliphant had similarly novelized his screenplay for The Slender Thread.) With a timing typical of the era, it was released by Dell Books as a tie-in edition six months in advance of the mini-series airing.

The novelization is more graphic than the miniseries (such as when Doug North and Holly Nagata make love in her car) and includes a subplot involving a Japanese fighter pilot who eventually strafes Doug North’s ship.

References

External links

American Broadcasting Company original programming
1970s American television miniseries
Attack on Pearl Harbor
1978 American television series debuts
1978 American television series endings
Television shows set in Hawaii
World War II television series
Pearl Harbor films
Films directed by Hy Averback
Films with screenplays by Stirling Silliphant